Children of Virtue and Vengeance is a 2019 young adult fantasy novel by Nigerian American novelist Tomi Adeyemi. It is the sequel to Children of Blood and Bone and the second book in the Legacy of the Orisha series. The novel follow Zélie as she tries to unite the maji, secure Amari's right to the throne and protect the maji from the new monarch's wrath.

Development
Tomi Adeyemi stated that writing the novel was harder than writing its predecessor because of the determination to balance the book ideas and the pressure from fans and her publishers to reach the deadline set for publication.

Writing the book over four rough drafts which were 600 pages long, Adeyemi wrote it as organic as she wanted it and as quickly as the ideas came to her while still exploring West African mythology.

Plot
After burying her father, Zélie, Tzain, Amari must face Queen Nehanda, who takes over Lagos. They must stop the Queen and her army, who have uncontrollable magic abilities, while defending Amari's claim to the throne in order to bring long lasting peace to the land of Orisha.

Reception
The book reached the number 1 on the New York Best Seller for young adult hardcover books and received generally positive reception like it predecessor.

Children of Virtue and Vengeance was included among the Times top 100 fantasy novel of all time.

References

Nigerian-American novels
Novels set in Nigeria
2019 American novels
2019 fantasy novels
American fantasy novels
African-American young adult novels
American young adult novels
American bildungsromans
Literature by African-American women
Nigerian English-language novels
Nigerian fantasy novels
2019 Nigerian novels
Henry Holt and Company books